The Attorney General of Abia State is the chief legal and law enforcement officer of Abia State. It is the executive branch of government that has its official appointed by the Governor with the approval of the Abia State House of Assembly.

The Attorney General who jointly serves as the Commissioner of Justice is responsible for the supervising and defending of the law and constitution of Abia State.

References

Attorneys General of Abia State
Executive Council of Abia State